Dhimitër Anagnosti (born 23 January 1936) is an Albanian film director of the 20th century. He was a member of the Parliament of Albania in the 1990s and a Minister of Culture, Youth and Sports. For his contribution in film, he received the People's Artist of Albania medal. In 2011, former president Bamir Topi accredited him the "Honor of the Nation" order, .

Early life

Anagnosti was born on January 23, 1936, in Vuno, a village in the Himara municipality, District of Vlorë Albania. After graduating the Ali Demi high school in Vlorë, he pursued his studies and graduated as a film director in Gerasimov Institute of Cinematography of Moscow.

In 1961, along with Viktor Gjika, Anagnosti directed the film, Njeriu kurrë nuk vdes, using as a script a short story from American writer, Ernest Hemingway. The work earned him First Prize in the World's Festival of Cinematographic Schools, in the Netherlands.

Career
He started to work as a cineast within Kinostudio Shqipëria e Re in 1961, with the film, Debatik in 1961 and subsequently with the film Toka jonë in 1964. He is also the writer of the first Albanian color documentary, Gurët dekorativë. In 1966 Anagnosti co-directed, with Viktor Gjika, Komisari i dritës, and a year later he directed Duel i heshtur.

Overall he has directed 14 films and 10 documentaries, and has won many national and international prizes. He is also the screenwriter of most of the films he directs.

For his extraordinary performance of some of the best Albanian films, he has been given the title Merited Artist of Albania, and in 1987, People's Artist of Albania. During the communist rule of Albania, however, many of his works were censored. He won the Cup to the Carrier in the Ninth Festival of the Albanian Film.

Political career
Between 1991-1996, Anagnosti was involved in politics. He was elected Member of the Albanian Parliament as a deputy of the Democratic Party of Albania. On April 12, 1992, he took over the post of Minister of Culture, Youth and Sports. He resigned on December 4, 1994. The reasons for his resignation were that Sali Berisha, then President of Albania, had not recognized the negative result of a popular referendum for a new constitution as his own political failure, and had not resigned himself.

Return to art
After leaving politics, Anagnosti created the Foundation for Art and Culture, endorsing the most active artists and contributing to the enhancement of Albanian culture and its international exposure. Among other things, this foundation has enabled the publication of 160 books.

In 2001 Anagnosti returned to his directing skills after many years of absence. For the National Theater of Albania, he directed the stage drama, "Nata e trokitjeve në xham". In 2005 he also directed a film, Gjoleka, djali i Abazit: The film won two international prizes in Italy.

Personal life
He is married to the Albanian actress Roza Anagnosti (Xhuxha), a Merited Artist of Albania.

Film direction
The following is a list of films directed by Anagnosti.
Gjoleka i biri i Abazit (2006)
Kthimi i ushtrisë së vdekur (1989) 
Përralle Nga e Kaluara (1987)
Gurët e shtëpisë sime (1985)
Kujtime nga Gjirokastra (1983)
Vëllezër dhe shokë (1982)
Në shtepinë tonë (1979)
Monumenti (film)|Monumenti (1977)
Lulëkuqet mbi mure (1976)
Kur hiqen maskat (1975)
Cuca e maleve (1974)
Përjetësi (1974)
Motive nga dita e diel (1973)
Malet me blerim mbuluar (1971)
Parafabrikatet (1970)
Plagë të vjetra (1968)
Duel i heshtur (1967)
Komisari i dritës (1966)
Njeriu kurrë nuk vdes (1961)

References

Albanian film directors
Albanian cinematographers
1936 births
Living people
Albanian screenwriters
People from Himara
Members of the Parliament of Albania
Democratic Party of Albania politicians 
Culture ministers of Albania
Sports ministers of Albania
Youth ministers of Albania
People's Artists of Albania
Gerasimov Institute of Cinematography alumni